Honkytonks and Heartaches is the third studio album by Canadian country music artist Gord Bamford. It was released on September 25, 2007 by Royalty Records.

The album was nominated for a 2008 Juno Award for Country Recording of the Year.

Track listing
"Blame It On That Red Dress" (Gord Bamford, Byron Hill, Zack Turner) – 3:12
"Postcard From Pasadena" (Gord Bamford, Byron Hill) – 2:48
"Blue Collar Place" (Gord Bamford, Duane Steele) – 3:24
"Little Guy" (Gord Bamford) – 3:42
"Stayed 'Til Two" (Gord Bamford, Byron Hill) – 2:19
"I Said Nothing" (Gord Bamford, Byron Hill, Tim Taylor) – 3:39
"Drinkin' Buddy" (Gord Bamford, Byron Hill, Mark Irwin) – 2:51
"Come Over Here" (Gord Bamford, Byron Hill, Tim Taylor) – 3:11
"In the Palm of Your Hands" (Gord Bamford, Dave Gunning) – 3:20
"Hurtin' Me Back" (Gord Bamford, Gil Grand) – 3:37
"Honkytonks and Heartaches" (Gord Bamford, Byron Hill) – 4:01
"Things Go Better with Love" (Gord Bamford, Byron Hill, Zack Turner) – 3:20
"Years Ago Last Night" (Gord Bamford, Byron Hill, Mike Dekle) – 2:56
duet with Jessie Farrell

References

2007 albums
Gord Bamford albums
Royalty Records albums
Albums produced by Byron Hill